The Old Curiosity Shop is a Charles Dickens novel. It may also refer to several adaptations of the novel, including:
 The Old Curiosity Shop (1911 film)
 The Old Curiosity Shop (1914 film)
 The Old Curiosity Shop (1921 film)
 The Old Curiosity Shop (1934 film)
 The Old Curiosity Shop (1975 film)
 The Old Curiosity Shop (TV series)
 The Old Curiosity Shop (1984 film)
 The Old Curiosity Shop (1995 film)
 The Old Curiosity Shop (2007 film)

See also
Ye Olde Curiosity Shop, a Seattle business